Ivan Bunn is a British historian and author. He is from Lowestoft, Suffolk.

Career
Ivan Bunn's first book was a small pamphlet published in 1975 entitled Haunted Lowestoft. The book was re-edited in 1988 and a third edition was released in the Winter of 2010. In 1997, he published a book detailing the Bury St. Edmunds witch trials with American Criminologist Gilbert Geis, a book which remains to date one of the most comprehensive studies of the trials and is used in most major universities. In 1997, he appeared in the Animal X segment about Black Dogs. In 2000, he was adviser for and appeared in the documentary "Witchfinders". In 2004, he starred opposite Rory McGrath in the Witchfinder General episode of Bloody Britain. In 2014 he appeared in the fourth episode of the Yesterday TV series "Inquisition". In 2015 he appeared opposite John Humphrys in a Panorama General Election special looking at hope in Lowestoft.

External links
 Bunn's website detailing the Lowestoft Witches

References

English historians
Living people
Year of birth missing (living people)
Place of birth missing (living people)
People from Lowestoft